Martin Keller may refer to:

 Martin Keller (psychiatrist), American psychiatrist
 Martin Keller (athlete) (born 1986), German track and field sprint athlete